The canton of Albi-3 is an administrative division of the Tarn department, southern France. It was created at the French canton reorganisation which came into effect in March 2015. Its seat is in Albi.

It consists of the following communes:

 Albi (partly)
 Cagnac-les-Mines
 Castelnau-de-Lévis
 Mailhoc
 Marssac-sur-Tarn
 Milhavet
 Sainte-Croix
 Terssac
 Villeneuve-sur-Vère

References

Cantons of Tarn (department)